The name Keli has been used for three tropical cyclones worldwide, one in the Eastern Pacific ocean and two in the South Pacific Region.

in Eastern Pacific:
 Hurricane Keli (1984) – remained over open waters.

in South Pacific region:
 Cyclone Keli (1986)  – a category 1 tropical cyclone (australian scale) minimal affected Vanuatu.
 Cyclone Keli (1997) – the first recorded post-season tropical cyclone to form in June within the South Pacific Ocean.
The name Keli was retired in the South Pacific basin after the 1996–97 season.

South Pacific cyclone set index articles
Pacific hurricane set index articles